RV3 may refer to:
 BOSS RV-3, an electric guitar effects pedal
 Mandala 3, the third mandala of the Rigveda
 RedVictor3, a heavily modified Vauxhall Victor
 Van's Aircraft RV-3, a kit aircraft